The 2010 KBS Drama Awards is a ceremony honoring the outstanding achievement in television on the Korean Broadcasting System (KBS) network for the year of 2010. It was held on December 31, 2010 and hosted by Choi Soo-jong, Lee Da-hae and Song Joong-ki.

Nominations and winners
(Winners denoted in bold)

References

External links
http://www.kbs.co.kr/drama/2010award/

KBS Drama Awards
KBS Drama Awards
KBS Drama Awards
KBS Drama Awards